Argyroderma is a genus consisting of over 50 species of succulents in the iceplant family from South Africa.

Description

These distinctive plants are among those known as "living stones", because their highly succulent, usually stemless, blue-green leaves occur at ground level and can resemble small stones. They form small clumps of a few or many paired, usually cylindrical to egg-shaped leaves that are cleft in the center. Each stem bears just 2 leaves per season but may produce offsets over the years. In some species the old leaves persist and form a short column on which new leaves develop. Solitary daisy-like flowers, usually white, yellow, or purple, appear in the cleft.

Distribution
The entire genus is naturally confined to a relatively small region in the far west of South Africa, known locally as the "Knersvlakte" area. This is a very arid region of winter-rainfall desert and rocky quartzite sands.

Cultivation
Like most succulents, they require extremely well-drained soil, and are damaged by repeated frosts. Their preferred mode of cultivation is a bright and sunny position with gritty free-draining soil. They may be propagated from seed, or careful division of established clumps.

Selected species

 List source :

References

External links
Botanica Sistematica

Aizoaceae
Aizoaceae genera
Taxa named by N. E. Brown